Heterocithara bilineata is a species of sea snail, a marine gastropod mollusk in the family Mangeliidae.

Description
(Original description) The shell is ovately turreted, moderately solid, pale straw-colour or light brown, nearly white around the aperture and at the base, with a narrow brown band just below the suture, and a second between the periphery and the base of the body whorl. The shell contains 6 whorls , angulate at the upper part, coarsely longitudinally ribbed and transversely ridged. The interstices are very finely decussately striated. The aperture is acuminately ovate. The outer lip is arcuate, contracted towards the base, and thickened behind. The posterior sinus is very shallow.

Distribution
This marine species is endemic to Australia and occurs off New South Wales and Victoria.

References

 Gatliff, J.H. & Gabriel, C.J. 1912. Additions to and alterations in the Catalogue of Victorian Marine Mollusca. Proceedings of the Royal Society of Victoria n.s. 25(1): 169–175

External links
  Tucker, J.K. 2004 Catalog of recent and fossil turrids (Mollusca: Gastropoda). Zootaxa 682:1–1295.
  Hedley, C. 1922. A revision of the Australian Turridae. Records of the Australian Museum 13(6): 213–359, pls 42–56 

bilineata
Gastropods described in 1871